Poor Robin Spring is a spring in the U.S. state of Georgia.

According to tradition, Poor Robin Spring was named after one Native American chieftain Robin, who believed the spring's waters held healing qualities.

References

Rivers of Georgia (U.S. state)
Rivers of Wilcox County, Georgia